The 2011 Home United FC season involves Home United competing in the 2012 S.League.

Squad

S.League squad

Transfers

Pre-season transfers

In

Out

Mid-season transfers

In

Out

Team statistics

Appearances and goals

Numbers in parentheses denote appearances as substitute.

Competitions

S.League

League table

Singapore Cup

Preliminary round

Quarter Final

Semi Final

Final

Singapore League Cup

References

Home United
2012